The Dingyuan railway station is a high-speed railway station in Dingyuan County, Chuzhou, Anhui, People's Republic of China. It is served by the Jinghu High-Speed Railway.

Railway stations in Anhui
Railway stations in China opened in 2011